Lois Anne Drinkwater (born April 15, 1951) is an American sprinter. She competed in the women's 400 metres at the 1968 Summer Olympics while still a student at Central High School in Phoenix, Arizona.

References

External links
 

1951 births
Living people
Athletes (track and field) at the 1968 Summer Olympics
American female sprinters
Track and field athletes from Phoenix, Arizona
Olympic female sprinters
21st-century American women
20th-century American women